Shengli Zhou is a professor of electrical and computer engineering at the University of Connecticut. He was named Fellow of the Institute of Electrical and Electronics Engineers (IEEE) in 2014 for contributions to wireless and underwater acoustic communications.

References

External links
Shengli Zhou

20th-century births
Living people
University of Connecticut faculty
Fellow Members of the IEEE
Year of birth missing (living people)
Place of birth missing (living people)